Events in the year 1812 in Norway.

Incumbents
Monarch: Frederick VI

Events

Arts and literature
Grøndahl & Søn Forlag publishing house, was established.

Births
6 January – Knud Knudsen, linguist (d.1895).
15 January – Peter Christen Asbjørnsen, writer and scholar (d.1885).
26 January – Andreas Grimelund, bishop (d.1896)
1 March – Iver Steen Thomle, jurist (d.1889)
28 November – Ludvig Mathias Lindeman, composer and organist (d.1887)
11 December – Jørgen Tandberg Ebbesen, politician (d.1887)

Full date unknown

Hans Jensen Blom, politician (d.1875)
Nils Elias Børresen, politician
Christian Hansen Vennemoe, politician

Deaths
26 October – Hans Peter Holm, naval officer (b. 1772).

References

See also